Anolis dracula the Dracula anole, is a species of lizard in the family Dactyloidae. The species is found in Ecuador and Colombia.

References

Anoles
Reptiles described in 2018
Reptiles of Ecuador
Reptiles of Colombia